Anawrahta Minsaw (d. March 1408) was king of Launggyet Arakan from 1406 to 1408. He was appointed to the position by his overlord King Minkhaung I of the Ava Kingdom. He later married Minkhaung's eldest daughter Saw Pyei Chantha. He was overthrown in 1408 by the Hanthawaddy Kingdom army, and subsequently executed on the order of King Razadarit of Hanthawaddy. He is one of two historical personalities that make up the Shwe Nawrahta nat spirit in the Burmese pantheon of nats.

Brief

Accession
Prior to his appointment as King of Arakan, he was known as Gamani, the governor of Kalay, a vassal Shan state of Ava. His rule at Kalay apparently was short. Circa December 1406, his overlord King Minkhaung I appointed him to be king of Arakan, which Ava forces led by Prince Minye Kyawswa had just conquered. Now known by his royal style of Anawrahta Minsaw, he was the third Ava-appointed king of Arakan.

Reign
According to the Arakanese chronicle Rakhine Razawin Thit, Anawrahta's regime brutally suppressed dissent, and never gained popular support. His overlord seemed oblivious. About a year later, Minkhaung sent his eldest daughter Saw Pyei Chantha to the Arakanese capital Launggyet to be Anawrahta's chief queen.

But their rule was soon to be challenged. By January 1408, King Razadarit of Hanthawaddy had decided to intervene. Pegu had been concerned about Ava's acquisitions (1404–1406) that had swallowed up nearer Shan states and Arakan. With the majority of Ava troops campaigning in the north in early 1408, Razadarit decided it was time. He sent in an invasion force to place either the former king of Arakan Min Saw Mon or Prince Min Khayi on the throne. The invasion force consisted of just 4000 to 5000 troops but they were greeted as liberators by the populace, and quickly advanced to the capital Launggyet. Anawrahta and his Ava coterie put up a fight but were quickly defeated. He tried to flee but was arrested. It was March 1408.

Anawrahta, Saw Pyei Chantha and 3000 prisoners of war (probably including the garrison's families) were deported to Bassein (Pathein) in the Irrawaddy delta. On arrival there, he was promptly executed while his young wife became a queen of Razadarit.

Legacy
Anawrahta is one of the two historical Nawrahtas who came to form the Shwe Nawrahta nat in the Burmese pantheon of nat spirits.

See also
 List of Arakanese monarchs

Notes

References

Bibliography
 
 
 
 
 
 

Monarchs of Launggyet
Ava dynasty
Burmese Theravada Buddhists
History of Rakhine
15th-century monarchs in Asia